Hinze is a German surname. Notable people with the surname include:

Andreas Hinze (born 1959), German footballer
Chris Hinze (born 1938), Dutch jazz musician 
Emma Hinze (born 1997), German racing cyclist
Gottfried Hinze (1873-1953), German businessman, athlete, and football administrator
Julius Oscar Hinze (1907-1993), Dutch scientist specialized in fluid dynamics
Kerstin Hinze, German rower
Kristy Hinze (born 1979), Australian model, actress and television host
Maria Hinze (born 1981), German visual artist 
Mats Hinze (born 1970), Swedish anarchist
Matthias Hinze (1969–2007), German actor and voice actor
Nate Hinze (born 1988), American wheelchair basketball player
Petra Hinze (born 1955), East German cross-country skier
Russ Hinze (1919–1991), Australian politician

See also
Hinze Dam, a dam in Queensland, Australia
Heinz (disambiguation)

German-language surnames